Roger Ducret (2 April 1888 – 10 January 1962) was a French fencer who competed at the 1920, 1924 and 1928 Olympics. At the 1924 Summer Olympics he entered five events out of six and earned a gold or silver medal in each of them, winning individual medals in all three competitive fencing disciplines: épée, foil and sabre. During his times, only one fencer did better, the Italian Nedo Nadi won five gold medals at the 1920 Summer Olympics.

During World War I Ducret was a prisoner of war. After retiring from competitions he worked as a journalist for Le Figaro, L'Echo des Sports and other newspapers.

See also
 List of Olympic medalists in fencing (men)
 List of multiple Olympic gold medalists
 List of multiple Summer Olympic medalists

References

1888 births
1962 deaths
Fencers from Paris
French male sabre fencers
French male épée fencers
French male foil fencers
Olympic fencers of France
Fencers at the 1920 Summer Olympics
Fencers at the 1924 Summer Olympics
Fencers at the 1928 Summer Olympics
Olympic gold medalists for France
Olympic silver medalists for France
Olympic bronze medalists for France
Olympic medalists in fencing
Medalists at the 1920 Summer Olympics
Medalists at the 1924 Summer Olympics
Medalists at the 1928 Summer Olympics
French military personnel of World War I
French prisoners of war in World War I
20th-century French people